Douglassia is a genus of sea snails, marine gastropod mollusks in the family Drilliidae.

Description
(Original description) The shell is of medium size. The whorls in the protoconch are well rounded and smooth. The postnuclear whorls show a broad concave area immediately below the summit, across which the axial ribs do not extend. The rest are convex. The base of the shell is  rather short. The columella is short and shows a feeble fasciole. The aperture is rather large, deeply channeled anteriorly and posteriorly, the posterior channel being immediately below the summit. The stromboid notch is conspicuously reflected. The columellar wall is reflected as a heavy callus. The parietal wall shows a heavy callus that forms a knob at the exterior angle. The sculpture consists of strong axial ribs that extend from the anterior limit of the concave area, where they are strongest over the base, growing feebler anteriorly. Fine incremental lines are also present on the ribs and in the intercostal spaces. The body of the whorls is marked by fine spiral lirations, while the columella has strong spiral cords.

Species
Species within the genus Douglassia include:
 Douglassia antillensis Fallon, 2016
 Douglassia bealiana Schwengel & McGinty, 1942
 Douglassia curasub Fallon, 2016
 Douglassia enae Bartsch, 1934
 Douglassia minervaensis Fallon, 2016
 Douglassia moratensis Fallon, 2016
Species brought into synonymy
 Douglassia nodosa Nowell-Usticke, 1969: synonym of Splendrillia interpunctata (E. A. Smith, 1882)

References

  Tucker, J.K. 2004 Catalog of recent and fossil turrids (Mollusca: Gastropoda). Zootaxa 682:1-1295
 Fallon P.J. (2016). Taxonomic review of tropical western Atlantic shallow water Drilliidae (Mollusca: Gastropoda: Conoidea) including descriptions of 100 new species. Zootaxa. 4090(1): 1-363

External links
 WMSDB - Worldwide Mollusc Species Data Base: family Drilliidae

 
Drilliidae
Gastropod genera